The 2017–18 season was Società Sportiva Calcio Napoli's 72nd season in Serie A. The team competed in Serie A, the Coppa Italia, the UEFA Champions League, and the UEFA Europa League.

In the league, Napoli set a new club record for points in a single Serie A season, finishing with 91, though this would only be good enough for 2nd place behind champions Juventus, with 95. Dries Mertens was once again the club's top league goalscorer, albeit with ten fewer goals than the previous season; he scored 18 in Serie A and 22 in all competitions. In the Coppa Italia Napoli were eliminated in the quarter-finals by Atalanta. In the Champions League, Napoli had first to navigate through the play-off round, successfully eliminating French club Nice with 2–0 wins in both legs, 4–0 on aggregate. However, having been drawn into a group with English club Manchester City, Ukrainian club Shakhtar Donetsk, and Dutch club Feyenoord, Napoli finished a disappointing third, with four defeats and only two victories. As a result Napoli dropped down to the round of 32 of the Europa League, once again experiencing European disappointment as they were eliminated on away goals after drawing 3–3 across two legs with German club RB Leipzig.

This was Maurizio Sarri's third and final season in charge of the club after signing from Empoli in the summer of 2015.

Players

Squad information
Last updated on 20 May 2018
Appearances include league matches only

Transfers

In

Loans in

Out

Loans out

Pre-season and friendlies

Competitions

Serie A

League table

Results summary

Results by round

Matches

Coppa Italia

UEFA Champions League

Play-off round

Group stage

UEFA Europa League

Knockout phase

Round of 32

Statistics

Appearances and goals

|-
! colspan=14 style="background:#5DAFE3; color:#FFFFFF; text-align:center"| Goalkeepers

|-
! colspan=14 style="background:#5DAFE3; color:#FFFFFF; text-align:center"| Defenders

|-
! colspan=14 style="background:#5DAFE3; color:#FFFFFF; text-align:center"| Midfielders

|-
! colspan=14 style="background:#5DAFE3; color:#FFFFFF; text-align:center"| Forwards

|-
! colspan=14 style="background:#5DAFE3; color:#FFFFFF; text-align:center"| Players transferred out during the season

Goalscorers

Clean sheets

Last updated: 20 May 2018

Disciplinary record

Last updated: 18 April 2018

References

S.S.C. Napoli seasons
Napoli
Napoli